Donald Haddow (born January 19, 1970) is a competitive freestyle swimmer from Canada, who was a member of the men's 4x200-metre freestyle relay team that finished in eighth position at the 1988 Summer Olympics in Seoul, South Korea.

References

1970 births
Living people
Canadian male freestyle swimmers
Olympic swimmers of Canada
Swimmers from Mississauga
Swimmers at the 1988 Summer Olympics